Christine Arthur (born 26 August 1963 in Stratford, New Zealand) played field hockey for New Zealand in the 1980s and 1990s.  Arthur was a member of the team that finished sixth at the 1984 Summer Olympics in Los Angeles, California, and eight years later competed with The Black Sticks at the 1992 Summer Olympics in Barcelona, where the team finished in eight position.  Arthur has also acted as coach for the Junior Women's national hockey team.

She lives in Auckland and is a deputy principal for Diocesan School for Girls.

References
 New Zealand Olympic Committee

External links
 

New Zealand female field hockey players
Olympic field hockey players of New Zealand
Field hockey players at the 1984 Summer Olympics
Field hockey players at the 1992 Summer Olympics
1963 births
Living people
20th-century New Zealand women
21st-century New Zealand women